Tway may refer to:
Tway, Saskatchewan, Canada
Tway, Kentucky, U.S.
 Liverpool–Parramatta T-way, a rapid bus system in the western suburbs of Sydney
 North-West T-way, a rapid bus system in the north-western suburbs of Sydney
T'way Air, South Korean low-cost airline

People with the name Tway
Bob Tway (born 1959), American golfer
Kevin Tway (born 1988), American golfer
R. C. Tway (1881–1964), American businessman and politician